Herceg Novi Municipality is one of the municipalities in southwestern Montenegro region. The administrative center is Herceg Novi.

Location and tourism
The Herceg Novi municipality stretches from Prevlaka to the Verige strait. An almost unbroken string of towns lie along this strip of coast, these include Prevlaka, Igalo, Herceg Novi, Baošići, Đenovići, Meljine, Zelenika, Sutorina and Bijela. Municipality is located at Adriatic coast in southwestern Montenegro, at the entrance to the Bay of Kotor and at the foot of Mount Orjen. Herceg Novi is one of the major tourist destinations in Montenegro. It is well known as a spa and health center; nearby Igalo has an abundance of healing sea mud called "igaljsko blato" (Igalo mud) and mineral springs called "igaljske slatine" (Igalo springs). The most famous tourist attractions in Herceg Novi are castle Forte Mare built in 1382, a clock tower built by Austrians in the 19th century, the Kanli tower built by Turks, and the Serbian orthodox church of St. Michael Archangel in central Belavista Square. Whilst the city itself is not a major destination for sunbathing, with no long sandy beaches along the rest of the Bay of Kotor, many beaches are reachable by boat. Popular Luštica peninsula beach sites include Žanjic, Mirište and Rose.

Local Assembly

Demographics 
The town of Herceg Novi is the administrative centre of the municipality. The municipality also includes the neighbouring towns of Igalo, Zelenika and Bijela, and has a population of 19,218 (2011 census). The town of Herceg Novi itself has 13,338 inhabitants.

Gallery

References

 
Municipalities of Montenegro